This article is part of the history of rail transport by country series

The history of rail transport in Latvia began with the construction in 1860 of a railway from Pytalovo to Dinaburg (now Daugavpils), 160 km in length, as part of the Saint Petersburg–Warsaw Railway.
 
More intensive development of railways in Latvia commenced the following year, 1861, when the 232 km long Riga - Dinaburg railway was opened.  It connected with the Saint Petersburg–Warsaw Railway, and thus joined the Latvian railways with the Russian rail network.  For the rest of the second half of the nineteenth century, the intensive construction of railways continued.  Lines constructed during that period included Dinaburg–Radviliškis, Mitau (now Jelgava)–Muravyovo (Mažeikiai), and others.

From the 1890s, narrow gauge lines were built to complement the broad gauge lines.  Most of the narrow-gauge railways were later converted to broad gauge, but then dismantled in the second half of the twentieth century.

See also

History of Latvia
Latvian Railways
Rail transport in Latvia

References

External links
 

Latvia
Rail
Rail transport in Latvia